Eugene R. "Bumper" Tormohlen (May 12, 1937 – December 27, 2018) was an American professional basketball player and coach. He was born and raised in Holland, Indiana; he attended Holland High and helped lead the Dutchmen to an IHSAA Sectional in 1953.

He was recruited to the University of Tennessee by former Purdue star Emmett Lowery.  During his time in Knoxville, Bumper became a 3-year starter, set the Tennessee career rebounding record (1,113 rebounds), a 16.9 rpg rate; was twice named All-SEC and was named to Converse's All-American team and become known to scores of Vols fans as the "Chairman of the Boards."

After a splendid college career at the University of Tennessee, Tormohlen was selected with the fifth pick in the second round of the 1959 NBA draft by the Syracuse Nationals.  However, his first years as a pro were spent in the NIBL with the Cleveland Pipers before being traded to the Kansas City Steers in the fledgling American Basketball League.  After two seasons in that league, he moved to the NBA, joining the St. Louis Hawks) in 1962.  His entire NBA playing career was with the Hawks; five seasons in St. Louis and one season in Atlanta.  He retired as an NBA player in 1970, having spent the 1968-68 & 1969-70 seasons as a player-coach for the Hawks. He was a member of the 1970 Western Division champions during his final season in uniform.

He remained with the Hawks, becoming an assistant coach for four seasons. With the Hawks at 28–46 and mired in a ten-game losing streak, he was promoted to replace Cotton Fitzsimmons on an interim basis on March 30, 1976. The next season, the team hired Hubie Brown as their full-time head coach.  He spent several seasons as the Director of College Scouting for the Los Angeles Lakers.

Tormohlen died on December 27, 2018, at age 81.

References

External links
 BasketballReference: Gene Tormohlen (as player)
 Gene Tormohlen (as coach)
 Gene Tormohlen Indiana Basketball Hall of Fame profile
 Gene Tormohlen SEC Legends

1937 births
2018 deaths
People from Dubois County, Indiana
American men's basketball coaches
American men's basketball players
Atlanta Hawks assistant coaches
Atlanta Hawks head coaches
Atlanta Hawks players
Basketball coaches from Indiana
Basketball players from Indiana
Centers (basketball)
Cleveland Pipers players
Kansas City Steers players
Phoenix Suns expansion draft picks
Power forwards (basketball)
St. Louis Hawks players
Syracuse Nationals draft picks
Tennessee Volunteers basketball players